The 2019–20 CAF Confederation Cup qualifying rounds were played from 9 August to 5 November 2019. A total of 69 teams competed in the qualifying rounds to decide the 16 places in the group stage of the 2019–20 CAF Confederation Cup.

Draw

The draw for the preliminary round and first round was held on 21 July 2019 at the CAF headquarters in Cairo, Egypt.

The entry round of the 53 teams entered into the draw was determined by their performances in the CAF competitions for the previous five seasons (CAF 5-Year Ranking points shown in parentheses).

Format

In the qualifying rounds, each tie was played on a home-and-away two-legged basis. If the aggregate score was tied after the second leg, the away goals rule was applied, and if still tied, extra time was not played, and the penalty shoot-out was used to determine the winner (Regulations III. 13 & 14).

Schedule
The schedule of the competition was as follows.

Bracket
The bracket of the draw was announced by the CAF on 21 July 2019.

The 16 winners of the first round advanced to the play-off round, where they were joined by the 16 losers of the Champions League first round.

Preliminary round
The preliminary round included the 42 teams that did not receive byes to the first round.

ESAE won 7–0 on aggregate.

Al-Ittihad won 3–1 on aggregate.

Maranatha won 3–0 on aggregate.

2–2 on aggregate. AS Pélican won 4–1 on penalties.

Paradou AC won 3–1 on aggregate.

Bolton City won 3–2 on aggregate.

Malindi won 1–0 on aggregate.

Ashanti Gold won 4–1 on aggregate.

Santoba won 5–4 on aggregate.

TS Galaxy won 2–0 on aggregate.

Young Buffaloes won 2–1 on aggregate.

Al-Khartoum won 4–1 on aggregate.

DC Motema Pembe won 4–0 on aggregate.

AS Kigali won 2–1 on aggregate.

Proline won 3–0 on aggregate.

1–1 on aggregate. Bandari won on away goals.

US Ben Guerdane won 5–1 on aggregate.

Azam won 3–2 on aggregate.

Triangle United won 5–0 on aggregate.

Pyramids won 5–1 on aggregate.

CR Belouizdad won 4–0 on aggregate.

First round
The first round, also called the second preliminary round, included 32 teams: the 11 teams that received byes to this round, and the 21 winners of the preliminary round.

0–0 on aggregate. ESAE won 3–2 on penalties.

1–1 on aggregate. Hassania Agadir won on away goals.

Djoliba won 3–2 on aggregate.

Enugu Rangers won 4–3 on aggregate.

Paradou AC won 3–1 on aggregate.

Zanaco won 5–1 on aggregate.

Al-Masry won 7–2 on aggregate.

RS Berkane won 4–3 on aggregate.

FC San Pédro won 3–0 on aggregate.

TS Galaxy won 4–1 on aggregate.

Bidvest Wits won 3–1 on aggregate.

3–3 on aggregate. DC Motema Pembe won 3–1 on penalties.

Proline won 3–2 on aggregate.

Bandari won 3–2 on aggregate.

Triangle United won 2–0 on aggregate.

Pyramids won 2–1 on aggregate.

Play-off round
The play-off round, also called the additional second preliminary round, included 32 teams: the 16 winners of the Confederation Cup first round, and the 16 losers of the Champions League first round.

The draw for the play-off round was held on 9 October 2019, 19:00 CAT (UTC+2), at the Hilton Pyramids Golf in Cairo, Egypt. The winners of the Confederation Cup first round were drawn against the losers of the Champions League first round, with the teams from the Confederation Cup hosting the second leg.

The teams were seeded by their performances in the CAF competitions for the previous five seasons (CAF 5-Year Ranking points shown in parentheses):
Pot A contained the eight seeded losers of the Champions League first round.
Pot B contained the six seeded winners of the Confederation Cup first round.
Pot C contained the eight unseeded losers of the Champions League first round.
Pot D contained the ten unseeded winners of the Confederation Cup first round.
First, a team from Pot A and a team from Pot D were drawn into eight ties. Next, a team from Pot B and a team from Pot C were drawn into six ties. Finally, the remaining teams from Pot C and Pot D were drawn into the last two ties.

The 16 winners of the play-off round advanced to the group stage.

Horoya won 5–2 on aggregate.

Pyramids won 5–1 on aggregate.

Enyimba won 4–1 on aggregate.

1–1 on aggregate. ESAE won 4–3 on penalties.

FC San Pédro won 2–1 on aggregate.

Paradou AC won 4–1 on aggregate.

DC Motema Pembe won 3–2 on aggregate.

Bidvest Wits won 8–1 on aggregate.

Djoliba won 5–0 on aggregate.

Hassania Agadir won 3–2 on aggregate.

Zanaco won 8–2 on aggregate.

RS Berkane won 5–2 on aggregate.

Al-Masry won 6–0 on aggregate.

2–2 on aggregate. Enugu Rangers won on away goals.

FC Nouadhibou won 4–3 on aggregate.

Al-Nasr won 4–2 on aggregate.

Notes

References

External links
Total CAF Confederation Cup, CAFonline.com
CAF Total Confederation Cup 2019/20

1
August 2019 sports events in Africa
September 2019 sports events in Africa
October 2019 sports events in Africa
November 2019 sports events in Africa